Two Japanese warships have borne the name Kiji:

 , a  launched in 1903 and stricken in 1923
 , an  launched in 1937 and ceded to Russia as Vnimatel'nyy in 1947 . 

Imperial Japanese Navy ship names
Japanese Navy ship names